Ardscoil La Salle, "De La Salle' or "The Della" as it is referred to by staff and students, is a co-educational voluntary Catholic secondary school located on the Raheny Road in Raheny, Dublin, Ireland.

History 
Ardscoil La Salle was founded in 1968 by the De La Salle Brothers, who had a residential base next door. The first Principal was Brother Cadogan and on his retirement Brother Benignus was appointed as Principal. Originally an all-boys school, it became co-educational in 1978, following initiatives by the Department of Education, and at this point the Marist Sisters joined the staff. It is a school in the De La Salle tradition sharing the mission of human and Christian education of young people.

Operation 
Ardscoil La Salle is a voluntary secondary school, funded by the Department of Education and part of the Le Cheile Catholic Schools Trust. A Board of Management, including representatives of parents, teachers and the trustees, the De La Salle Brothers, oversees the administration of the school. Day-to-day management of the school is the responsibility of the Principal who is also secretary to the Board of Management.

The school has multiple facilities including four science labs and home economics rooms, engineering room, woodwork room, building construction room, technical drawing room, lecture theatres, a large sports hall, an oratory, interview rooms and two large art rooms.

In 2012 it was announced that Ardscoil La Salle was requiring all new first year students to purchase Apple iPads as they move towards more interactive means of education.

Curriculum 
Ardscoil La Salle follows the curriculum programmes set down by the Department of Education and Science. Students take the Junior Certificate and Leaving Certificate exams, and Transition Year is optional.

Junior Certificate 
First, second and third year students currently study the core subjects.
 Irish
 English
 Maths
 History
 Geography
 Religious Education
 Social, Personal and Health Education
 Civics, Social and Political Education
 Physical Education

The optional subjects are sampled in the first term of first year before students make a decision on what two subjects they will pick.
 French
 Home Economics
 Art, Craft and Design
 Technical Graphics
 Metalwork
 Materials Technology Wood
Business Studies
Science

Transition Year 
Ardscoil La Salle offers Transition Year on an optional basis. A proportion of the material is based on the Leaving Certificate syllabus. Subjects studied include:
 Irish
 Maths
 English
 French
 Chemistry
 Biology
 Art
 History
 Geography
 Physical Education
 Mini company (Business Studies)
 Music

Leaving Certificate 
Fifth and sixth year students currently study the core subjects.
 Irish
 Maths
 English
 Religious Education
 Physical Education

Students choose another four optional subjects in Transition Year to study for their Leaving Certificate.
 French
 Chemistry
 Biology
 History
 Geography
 Business Studies
 Home Economics
 Art, Craft and Design
 Engineering
 Construction Studies

Uniform 
The boys' uniform consists of a royal blue jumper with the school crest, a blue shirt, a blue and silver striped tie, grey trousers and black shoes. The girls' uniform consists of the same royal blue jumper and tie, a white blouse, a royal blue skirt and black shoes. Girls can also opt for grey trousers with a blue pinstripe instead. The senior uniform is the same except the jumpers are a dark navy colour. Students are recommended to buy a school coat for the winter weather. There is no uniform for physical education and students can wear their own clothes as long as they are school appropriate.

Extracurricular activities 
The school runs a Breakfast Club, an After School Club, a Cooking Club, a Fitness Club, a Rock School, indoor football games, a Glee Club, an after school study facility, a chess club and several sports teams.

Notable people 
Jon Berkeley, artist, past pupil
Graham Dale, author of The Green Marine, past pupil
Martin King, weather presenter on TV3, past pupil
Gerry McCaul, former Dublin Gaelic footballer/manager, former Headmaster
Vinny Murphy, former Dublin Gaelic footballer, past pupil

Schools in the Republic of Ireland
Secondary schools in Dublin (city)
Raheny